Mankanya may refer to:
Mankanya language
Mankanya people